Jarash was a Palestinian village that was depopulated over the course of 1948 Arab-Israeli war. Located 25 kilometers west of Jerusalem, Jarash was a wholly Arab village of 220 inhabitants in 1948. The immediate region to the west of the site of Jarash, upon two hills separated by a valley, grew orchards belonging to the village inhabitants consisting of carobs, figs, almonds and olives. Cave dwellings dot the landscape of this region.

History

The area immediately to the west of Jarash, as one descends into the valley below, is marked by several very old agricultural terraces, built of large stones. Their use was to retain the top soil and to prevent the soil run-off from heavy rains. The nearby grounds are strewn with potsherds; evidence of an early settlement. To the east of the village lay Khirbat Sira, which is identified with a Mamluk/Ottoman village.

Ottoman era
In 1838, Jerash was noted as a Muslim village, located in  district of el-Arkub, southwest of Jerusalem.

In 1863 Victor Guérin found Jarash to have 25 inhabitants, living at that time in "miserable huts."  An Ottoman   village list from about 1870  found that the village had  a population of 53, in a total of  13  houses, though the population count included men, only.   

In 1883, the PEF's Survey of Western Palestine described  Jarash as a village built on the spur of a hill with olive trees growing below it.

In 1896 the population of  Dscherasch was estimated to be about 105 persons.

British Mandate era
In the 1922 census of Palestine, conducted by the British Mandate authorities,  Jarash  had a population 115,  all  Muslims,  increasing  in the 1931 census   to 164, still all Muslim,  in a total of  33 houses.

In  the 1945 statistics  the population was 190, all Muslims, while the total land area was 3,518  dunams, according to an official land and population survey.  Of this,  5  were allocated  for plantations and irrigable land, 1,335 for cereals, while 5  dunams were classified as built-up areas.

State of Israel
Following the war, the area was incorporated into the State of Israel. The town's land was left undeveloped, though Zanoah was founded in 1950, about 2 km west of the village site.

Walid Khalidi writes of Jarash in 1992:"The site is overgrown with grass, interspersed with the debris of destroyed houses and stones from the terraces. The ruins of a cemetery lie northwest of the site. Groves of trees cover two hills to the west of the site that are separated by a valley. Carob, fig, almond, and olive trees grow on these hills."

Archaeology
Boaz Zissu of the Israel Antiquities Authority conducted an archaeological survey of Jarash in the year 2000. The old ruins of Jarash lay at the center of a spur, at some 200 meters west of the now ruined Arab village, spread over an area of only about 5 dunams (1.2 acres) and built upon two levels. According to Zissu, the site may have served as a farmstead for share-croppers who worked the adjacent fields. Most of the pottery samples collected in situ date back to the early Roman period, and a few from the Iron Age III era, as well as from the Mameluk era. Structures made of hewn stone were still visible from the Roman era.  Two plastered cisterns in an enclosed area are also noticeable on the site. In one corner of the ruin are seen three monolithic, rectangular-shaped pillars ca.  high, aligned in a row, still standing upon their original foundation. In the lower level, structures made of field stones are still to be seen there, spread over an area 20 x 30 meters. On the rocky precipice to the east of the site are caves partially filled-in by erosion, with exposed square-like entrances, and wine-presses carved into the rock. Zissu has noted the presence of two ritual ablutions or baths (miqva'ot) in the site, evidence that the site was formerly inhabited by Jews, and raises the suggestion that it may have once been the Gerasa mentioned by Josephus in The Jewish War (4.9.1), although with some reservations, citing a more probable locale in the nearby ruin of Kh. Jurish.

Gallery

See also
Depopulated Palestinian locations in Israel
List of villages depopulated during the Arab-Israeli conflict

References

Bibliography

External links
Welcome To Jarash
  Jarash,    Zochrot
Survey of Western Palestine, Map 17:    IAA, Wikimedia commons 
Jarash  from the Khalil Sakakini Cultural Center

Arab villages depopulated during the 1948 Arab–Israeli War
District of Jerusalem
1948 disestablishments in Israel